The Awakening (1928) is a feature film directed by Victor Fleming and starring Vilma Bánky. It was based on a story by Frances Marion.

Plot
In Alsace, which was under German occupation, shortly before the outbreak of the First World War. Marie Ducrot is a pretty young peasant woman who falls in love with Count Karl von Hagen, a German army officer. Marie is seen when she visits von Hagen in his quarters. The people suffering under the occupation see Marie as a traitor and assault her physically. Marie disappears and is believed dead. But she has fled to a monastery where she is accepted as a novice.

The war breaks out. Von Hagen is wounded in fighting near the monastery. Marie nurses him back to health. Von Hagen wants her to go to Germany with him. The French lieutenant Le Bête helps the two to reach the German lines. The couple get to safety, but Le Bête is killed by a sniper's bullet.

Cast
Vilma Bánky as Marie Ducrot
Walter Byron as Count Karl von Hagen
Louis Wolheim as Le Bete
George Davis as The Orderly
William Orlamond as Grandfather Ducrot
Carl von Haartman as Lieutenant Franz Geyer

Reception

the film was nominated for the Academy Award for Best Production Design at the 2nd Academy Awards. The Nominee, William Cameron Menzies was also nominated the same year for Alibi (1929 film).

Critical reception 
A review in the trade publication Harrison's Reports summarized the film as "'spotty;' that is, it is good, in fact very good, in spots; on the other hand, in spots it is slow, and even poor." It also commended Banky and Byron for "good work" in their roles and Fleming for his direction.

Preservation status
The film is presumed lost.

References

External links

1928 films
1928 drama films
American black-and-white films
American silent feature films
Films directed by Victor Fleming
Samuel Goldwyn Productions films
Lost American films
Silent American drama films
1928 lost films
Lost drama films
1920s American films